This is a list of Intamin amusement rides. Some were supplied by, but not manufactured by, Intamin.

List of roller coasters

As of 2021, Intamin has built 172 roller coasters around the world.

List of other attractions

Drop towers

Ferris wheels

All double and triple wheels listed below were manufactured by Waagner Biro AG and were supplied to the parks by Intamin.

Flume rides

Commonly known as Flume ride, Intamin refers to these rides as Flume Ride or Reversing Boat Ride.

Freefall rides

Observation towers

Gyro towers similar to those listed below that were built prior to 1971 did not involve Intamin and therefore should not be listed here. Well-known rides such as Cedar Point's Space Spiral, AstroWorld's Astroneedle and Coney's Space Tower were built by Willy Bühler Space Towers Company of Berne, Switzerland with cabins by Von Roll. In 1971 Intamin started marketing these towers and contracted these same companies to build them. Willy Bühler Space Towers was eventually acquired by Von Roll.

River rapids rides

Shoot the chute rides

Commonly known as Shoot the Chute, Intamin refers to these rides as Spillwater, Super Splash, Mega Splash or Hyper Splash.

Other rides

See also
 :Category:Amusement rides manufactured by Intamin
 :Category:Roller coasters manufactured by Intamin
 :Category:Water rides manufactured by Intamin

Notes

References

External links
 Listing of Intamin roller coasters at the Roller Coaster DataBase